Pascual Pérez is the name of:

 Pascual Pérez (baseball) (1957–2012), Dominican baseball player
 Pascual Pérez (boxer) (1926–1977), Argentine flyweight boxer